Agapanthia altaica is a species of beetle in the family Cerambycidae. It was described by Plavilstshikov in 1933.

References

altaica
Beetles described in 1933